Julio Ramón Aguilar Franco (born 1 July 1986) is a Paraguayan footballer. He is a striker.

Career
Aguilar finished as the second highest scorer of the Paraguayan Apertura 2008 tournament scoring 12 goals.

Before joining Tigres de la UANL, he played for Fernando de la Mora and 12 de Octubre in Paraguay.

References

External links

 BDFA profile

1986 births
Living people
Paraguayan footballers
Paraguayan expatriate footballers
Paraguay international footballers
Paraguayan Primera División players
Liga MX players
Tigres UANL footballers
Club Atlético Tigre footballers
Club Rubio Ñu footballers
12 de Octubre Football Club players
Club Olimpia footballers
Independiente F.B.C. footballers
F.C. Paços de Ferreira players
Club Sol de América footballers
Club Atlético 3 de Febrero players
General Díaz footballers
Deportivo Capiatá players
Atlético Mexiquense footballers
Boca Unidos footballers
C.D. Técnico Universitario footballers
Club Martín Ledesma players
Paraguayan expatriate sportspeople in Mexico
Paraguayan expatriate sportspeople in Argentina
Paraguayan expatriate sportspeople in Portugal
Paraguayan expatriate sportspeople in Ecuador
Expatriate footballers in Mexico
Expatriate footballers in Argentina
Expatriate footballers in Portugal
Expatriate footballers in Ecuador
Expatriate footballers in Guatemala
Association football forwards